Saint Michael's School of Padada also referred to by its acronym SMSP is a private Catholic basic education institution  run by the Sisters of the Presentation of Mary in Padada, Davao del Sur, Philippines. The school was founded by the Missionary Sisters of the Immaculate Conception (MIC) in 1954. It focuses on the teaching of religion, the integration of faith in all subject areas, and provision for daily living of the faith within the school campus.

SMSP is a member of the Catholic Educational Association of the Philippines (CEAP), the largest organized group of Catholic schools in the country, with about 1,194 members as instituted in 1941.

History

In 1954, the Missionary Sisters of the Immaculate Conception (MIC) accepted the invitation of the late Most Reverend Clouis Thibault, P.M.E., then bishop of the prelature of Davao, to open a school in Padada, Davao del Sur.

Shortly after their arrival, the sisters started the construction of the school with the help of Father Paul Gravel, P.M.E., who was then the parish priest of the Padada. The school was formally opened in the school year 1954-1955. Sister Claire del Eucharistie, M.I.C., was the first directress, and Sister Genevieve St. Pierre, M.I.C., was her assistant.

The school changed names three times in its first 25 years. It was first known as St. Michael's Academy (SMA). When a college department was opened, it became St. Michael's College (SMC). When the college was phased out, it became Saint Michael's School of Padada (SMSP).

As in all religious institutions, the M.I.C sisters underwent a renewal program and re-evaluated their work in the Philippines. In 1980, the Sisters of the Presentation of Mary formally took over the administration of SMSP.

School curriculum
As a Catholic School, SMSP aims to develop students in all aspects of their personality, physical, intellectual, cultural, emotional, moral and spiritual according to the teachings of Jesus Christ. As a Filipino School, the institution aims to inculcate love of country, duties of citizenship, and sincere appreciation of cultural heritage.

The academic program utilizes strategies geared to develop spiritual and social responsibilities. These include:

 Contextualization of all academic courses within the needs of the Catholic church and the needs of society, including the social ills that beset the Philippines.
 Discussion, evaluation of and reflection on students' experiences regarding their involvement in the church and in community activities and extra-curricular activities done within the academic program.
 Values Education, which encompasses the endangered Filipino values, and which is integrated in all subjects.

Location
SMSP is situated at Quezon St., N.C. Ordaneza District in Padada, Davao del Sur, with School ID no. 405404.

References

Catholic secondary schools in the Philippines
Catholic elementary schools in the Philippines
Educational institutions established in 1946
Schools in Davao del Sur
1946 establishments in the Philippines